Mountnessing Windmill is a grade II* listed post mill at Mountnessing, Essex, England. Built in 1807, it was most recently restored to working order in 1983.

History
Mountnessing Windmill was built in 1807, replacing an earlier mill. There are records of a windmill here since 1477. The mill was working until 1924, and it worked again in 1932-33.

In 1937, ownership of the mill passed from the Blencowe Estates to Mountnessing Parish Council. It was repaired as a memorial to King George VI, whose coronation was in that year.

Restoration
The mill was restored to working order between 1979 and 1983. A complete new roof was fitted, and the tail of the mill rebuilt. New sails were fitted, and the mill officially opened by Hervey Benham on 13 November 1983. The internal machinery has been rebuilt by Peter Stenning and Richard Seago, and the mill is in full working order.

Description

Mountnessing Windmill is a post mill with a single-storey sixteen-sided roundhouse. The mill is winded by a tailpole. It has four spring sails. There are two pairs of millstones in the breast.

Trestle and roundhouse
The trestle is of oak, with the main post of elm. The mill was originally built as an open trestle mill, with a roundhouse added at a later date. Three of the crosstree/quarterbar joints have been strengthened with bolted splints. The sixteen-sided roundhouse is of brick, with a boarded roof covered in tarred felt. It had a thatched roof until 1909, when it was replaced as it was infested with rats.

Body
The crowntree is  square in section. It receives a  diameter pintle projecting from the top of the main post.

Sails and windshaft
As originally built, the mill would have had a wooden windshaft and four common sails. The sails are spring sails. The windshaft is of cast iron, replacing the former wooden one. It was probably second-hand when fitted to the mill. It has a mounting for a tail wheel, which would have been forward-facing when fitted; this and other evidence shows that the mill was originally built with a head and tail layout.

Machinery
The wooden brake wheel is of clasp arm construction. It has 77 cogs of  pitch, driving a wooden wallower with 21 cogs. The cast-iron spur wheel is  diameter with 66 cogs. It drives the two pairs of millstones underdrift via two  diameter stone nuts with 32 cogs each. The mill was assisted in its later years by a portable steam engine, which had been built by Wedlake & Dendy Ltd., Engineers of Hornchurch and carried their works number 74.

Millers
Robert Agnis 1807 - 1826
Joseph Agnis 1826 - 
Alfred Agnis 1863
Joseph Agnis  - 1906
Robert Agnis 1908 - 1924
Emily Agnis 1932 - 1933

References for above:-

Public access
The mill is open to the public on the third Sunday of each month between May and October.

References

External links
Essex Country Parks webpage on Mountnessing Post Mill
Windmill World webpage on Mountnessing Windmill

Post mills in the United Kingdom
Grinding mills in the United Kingdom
Windmills completed in 1807
Grade II* listed buildings in Essex
Museums in Essex
Mill museums in England
Monuments and memorials in Essex
Windmills in Essex
Borough of Brentwood
Grade II* listed windmills